Severe Tropical Cyclone Prema was among the worst tropical cyclones to hit Vanuatu since 1987's Cyclone Uma. The twenty-third storm of the season, Prema formed early on 26 March 1993 as a weak tropical depression.

Meteorological history

During the next day the system initially moved north-westwards, before it turned and moved south-westwards as it organised and developed further.

 During that day the depression moved towards the northwest, before it turned and started to move towards the southwest during 26 March as it gradually developed further. During 27 March, both TCWC Nadi and the Joint Typhoon Warning Center reported that the depression had developed into a tropical cyclone with Nadi naming it as Prema.

Preparations and impact
Severe Tropical Cyclone Prema was the first named tropical cyclone to affect Vanuatu after six systems had affected the archipelago during the previous season. Prema affected the island nation between 29 –30 March, where it caused extensive damage parts of Shefa Province, including on Epi, Efate and the Shepherd Islands.

Due to the impact of this system, the name Prema was subsequently retired, by the World Meteorological Organization's RA V Tropical Cyclone Committee.

See also
 Cyclone Bola
 Cyclone Ivy

References

External links

Category 4 South Pacific cyclones
Tropical cyclones in Vanuatu
Tropical cyclones in New Caledonia
Retired South Pacific cyclones